Austroplaca is a genus of lichen-forming fungi in the family Teloschistaceae. It has 10 species. The genus was circumscribed in 2013 by Ulrik Søchting, Patrik Frödén, and Ulf Arup, with Austroplaca ambitiosa assigned as the type species.

Species
Austroplaca ambitiosa 
Austroplaca cirrochrooides 
Austroplaca darbishirei 
Austroplaca erecta 
Austroplaca frigida  – Antarctica
Austroplaca hookeri 
Austroplaca johnstonii 
Austroplaca lucens 
Austroplaca millegrana 
Austroplaca soropelta

References

Teloschistales
Lichen genera
Taxa described in 2013
Teloschistales genera